In the modern Pagan movement of Heathenry there are a number of holidays celebrated by different groups and individuals. The most widely observed are based on ancient Germanic practices described in historical accounts or folk practices; however, some adherents also incorporate innovations from the 20th and 21st centuries.

Pre-Christian Germanic holidays and their modern observance 

Prior to Christianisation and the introduction of the Julian calendar, the Germanic peoples used a lunisolar calendar, that was used to coordinate heathen seasonal festivals and holy periods.

Beyond these, Adam of Bremen's account of the Temple at Uppsala describes a great festival that was held every nine years, however it has been argued that this would have been using inclusive counting and would thus have occurred every eight years by modern counting conventions.

Modern Heathens can celebrate a number of these festivals, with Winter Nights, Yule and Sigrblót being among the most widely observed, however the date is typically adjusted so that it falls on a weekend.

Modern development  
The modern Icelandic festival of Þorrablót is sometimes considered a "pagan holiday" due to folk etymology with the name of the god Thor. The name, while historically attested, is derived from Þorri which is not explicitly linked to Thor, instead being the name of a month in the historic Icelandic calendar and a legendary Finnish king. Despite this, toasts to Thor are commonly included in the modern celebration.

Beyond the information about historical practice given in Early Medieval sources, some Heathens use modern festival calendars that incorporate material from other new religious movements such as the "Wheel of the Year" popular in Wicca. This practice is criticised by other Heathens, however, due to its origin in the 20th century and its lack of connection to historical celebrations. 

In addition to this, several groups in the USA have designated holidays through ad hoc innovation, such as the various "Days of Remembrance" introduced by The Troth or "Vali's Day", derived from Valentine's Day by a folk etymology connection with the deity Váli.

Suggestions for rituals suited for these various holidays were published by Edred Thorsson, A Book of Troth (1989) and by Kveldulf Gundarsson, Teutonic Religion (1993).
James Chisholm (1989) published a suggestion for Ostara. Chisholm argued for the reconstruction of the "sacred dramas" which he saw reflected in some Eddaic poems, although shorn of their sexual content by the Christian redactors. The revived ritual was again to be modified to suit "contemporary American sensibilities".

Specific modern calendars

Samfundet Forn Sed Sverige (Sweden) 
Samfundet Forn Sed Sverige, has a list of annual holidays held during specific periods of the year.

The Troth (USA) 
The handbook Our Troth: Heathen Life published by American-based inclusive Heathen organization The Troth in 2020, lists three holidays that most Heathens agree on, Yule, Winter Nights/Alfarblot/Disablot and Summer Nights/Sigrblot. 

Then there are the holidays that Heathens don't agree on but many celebrate: Disting (Second Full Moon of the New year), Lenzen (Full Moon Cycle around Vernal Equinox),  Ostara (First Full Moon After Vernal Equinox), May Day (May 1st),  Midsummer/Litha (Summer Solstice), Lammas (Full moon after autumnal equinox) and Sunwait (starts 6 weeks before Winter Solstice).

Holy "day" is a misnomer, as many of these observances are celebrated over several days, such as the 12 days of Yule or the six weeks of Sunwait.

Ingwine Heathenship (USA/UK) 
The movement Ingwina Hæðenscipe, which seeks to reconstruct West Germanic Heathen beliefs, also has a list of annual holidays held during specific periods of the year. The group provides both reconstructed, and entirely modern dates for these festivals for the benefit of modern practitioners.

See also
 Thing (assembly)
 Slavic Native Faith's calendars and holidays

References

Modern pagan holidays
Germanic neopaganism
Lists of observances